Prime Evil is a 1997 EP released by Raymond Watts (as PIG) It was released exclusively in Japan as a follow-up to 1996's Wrecked.  It features four remixes of tracks from Wrecked as well as a cover of Black Sabbath's "War Pigs" and the original tracks "Prime Evil" and "The Keeper of the Margarita".

Track listing

 "Prime Evil" (Raymond Watts, Steve White) – 6:41
 "Wrecked (Ken Ishii Remix)" (Watts, White) – 6:38
 "War Pigs" (Tony Iommi, Ozzy Osbourne, Geezer Butler, Bill Ward)  – 6:25
 "Everything (PIG Remix)" (Watts, Santos de Castro) – 4:29
 "The Keeper of the Margarita" (Watts, White) – 6:07
 "Save Me (Locust Remix)" (Watts) – 4:58
 "Silt (Euphonic Remix)" (Watts) – 6:41

Personnel
Raymond Watts
Steve White
Giles Littlefield – additional noise and programming
Jo Maskell – vocals (3)

References

Pig (musical project) albums
1997 EPs